Gould is a surname, a variant of "Gold"

Acting
 Alexander Gould (born 1994), American actor
 Dana Gould, American comedian and writer
 Desiree Gould (1945–2021), American actress
 Elliott Gould (born 1938), American actor
 Harold Gould (1923–2010), American actor
 James Nutcombe Gould (1849–1899), English stage actor
 Jason Gould (born 1966), American actor, writer and director
 Julia Gould (1824–1893), English-born stage actress and singer
 Kelly Gould, American actress
 Mitzi Gould (born 1915), American actress
 Nolan Gould, (born 1998), American actor
 Peter Gould, American television drama screenwriter
 Sandra Gould (1916–1999), American actress and comedian

Arts and letters
 Alan J. Gould (1898–1993), American newspaper editor
 Chester Gould, creator of popular comic book character Dick Tracy
 Edd Gould (1988–2012), British animator, creator of Eddsworld
 Edward Sherman Gould, 19th-century American author, translator and critic
 Elizabeth Porter Gould (1848–1906), American poet and author
 Emily Gould (born 1981), American author
 Francis Carruthers Gould, British caricaturist and political cartoonist
 Gerald Gould, English writer, journalist, reviewer, essayist and poet
 Hal Gould, American photographer and gallery curator
 Hannah Flagg Gould (1789–1865), American poet
 J. J. Gould, Canadian journalist
 Joan Gould (born 1927), American author and journalist
 Karen L. Gould (born 1948) American scholar of French-Canadian literature, president of Brooklyn College
 Nat Gould, English journalist and writer of horse racing novels
 Rebecca Gould, American writer, translator, and Professor of Islamic Studies
 Steven Gould, American science fiction writer
 Thomas R. Gould, American sculptor
 Warwick Gould (born 1947), Australian literary scholar
 Manny Gould (1904–1975), American animator

Business
 Andrew Gould (businessman) (born 1946), Schlumberger executive
 George Jay Gould I (1864–1923) American railroad president
 Jay Gould (1836–1892), American financier
 James Childs Gould (1880–1944), British/American industrialist
 Kingdon Gould Jr. (1924–2018), American businessman and diplomat
 Kingdon Gould Sr. (1887–1945), American businessman

Math and science
 Alice Bache Gould (1868–1953), American mathematician, philanthropist, and historian
 Augustus Addison Gould, American conchologist
 Benjamin Apthorp Gould, American astronomer
 Charles N. Gould, American geologist of Masterson, Texas
 Elizabeth Gould (psychologist), professor of psychology at Princeton University
 Gordon Gould, American physicist, inventor of the laser
 Henry W. Gould, American mathematician
 Ian Gould (geologist), Australian geologist, chancellor of the University of South Australia
 John Gould (1804–1881), English ornithologist and artist
 John Stanton Gould (1810–1874), American science lecturer, temperance reformer, agricultural scientist and politician
 Laurence McKinley Gould (1896–1995), American geologist, educator, polar explorer
 Rupert Gould (1890–1948), British horologist
 Stephen Jay Gould (1941–2002), American paleontologist and science writer
 William Gould (naturalist), English naturalist and cleric

Military
 Charles Gilbert Gould (1845–1916), Union Army soldier and Medal of Honor recipient
 Davidge Gould (1758–1847), Royal Navy admiral
 Herbert Gould, Royal Air Force World War I flying ace
 Michael C. Gould, 18th Superintendent of the U.S. Air Force Academy
 Thomas William Gould (1914–2001), English recipient of the Victoria Cross

Music
 Billy Gould (born 1963), American musician and producer
 Boon Gould (1955–2019), English musician, member of the band Level 42
 Glenn Gould (1932–1982), Canadian pianist
 Morton Gould (1913–1996), American composer, conductor and arranger
 Phil Gould (musician) (born 1957), English musician, member of the band Level 42
 Stephen Gould (tenor), American tenor

Politics
 Arthur R. Gould (1857–1946), U.S. senator
 Basil Gould (1883–1956), British Political Officer
 Benjamin Gould (politician) (1849–1922), South Australian politician
 Bryan Gould (born 1939), British politician
 Georgia Gould (politician), British politician, daughter of Philip
 James Childs Gould (1880–1944) industrialist and British Member of Parliament
 James J. Gould (1823–1909), Michigan state representative
 John Gould (MP), British politician and Director of the East India Company
 John Stanton Gould (1810–1874), American science lecturer, temperance reformer, agricultural scientist and politician
 Joseph Gould (politician, born 1808) (1808–1886), farmer, businessman and political figure in Ontario, Canada
 Joseph Gould (politician, born 1911) (1911–1965), Canadian politician
 Karina Gould (born 1987), Canadian politician
 Monica Gould (born 1957), Australian former politician
 Nathaniel Gould (1661–1728), British politician and Governor of the Bank of England
 Nathaniel Gould (died 1738), British politician
 Philip Gould, Baron Gould of Brookwood (born 1950), British political advisor

Sports
 Al Gould (1888–1935), American baseball player 
 Arthur Corbin Gould (1850–1903), American shooter and writer on guns
 Arthur Gould (rugby union) (1864–1919), Welsh rugby union player
 Arthur Gould (wrestler) (1892–1948), British Olympic wrestler
 Bert Gould, Welsh international rugby player
 Bob Gould (rugby player), Welsh international rugby player
 Bobby Gould (ice hockey), former National Hockey League player
 Bobby Gould, English footballer and manager
 Carol Gould (athlete), English long-distance runner
 Chad Gould, Philippines footballer, England beach soccer international
 Charlie Gould (1847–1917), American baseball player
 Donna Gould (born 1966), Australian cyclist
 Georgia Gould, mountain biker
 Horace Gould, English motor racing driver
 Ian Gould (born 1957), English former cricketer and umpire
 James Gould (rower), New Zealand rower
 Jay Gould II (1888–1935) champion tennis player
 Jonny Gould, English radio sports broadcaster
 Martin Gould, English snooker player
 Phil Gould (rugby league), Australian rugby league footballer, coach and commentator
 Robbie Gould, placekicker for the San Francisco 49ers
 Shane Gould, Australian swimmer
 Wally Gould (1938–2018), English footballer

Other
 Alfred Gould (surgeon) (1852–1922), British physician, Dean of Medicine and Vice-Chancellor of the University of London
 Arthur L. Gould, American educator
 Bob Gould (activist) (1937–2011), Australian activist and bookseller
 Carl Freylinghausen Gould, American architect
 Cecil Gould, English art historian
 Ezra Palmer Gould, minister and biblical scholar
 Frederick James Gould, English teacher, writer and pioneer secular humanist
 Harry Gould (editor) (died 1974), editor of the Tribune, Australian Communist newspaper
 James Gould (jurist), American law school professor
 Jay Gould (1836–1892), railroad developer and speculator
 Louisa Gould, Jewish activist
 Matthew Gould (born 1971), British Ambassador to Israel
 Robert S. Gould (1826–1904), Texas Supreme Court justice and Confederate colonel
 Sara K. Gould, American feminist and philanthropist
 Steven B. Gould (born 1966), American lawyer and judge
 Thomas Gould (Baptist) (c. 1619–1675), first pastor of the First Baptist Church of Boston, Massachusetts
 Todd Gould, American psychiatrist

See also
 Justice Gould (disambiguation)
 Gulda

References

English-language surnames
Surnames of Old English origin